Keith Adams may refer to:
Keith Adams (filmmaker) (1926–2012), Australian adventurer and filmmaker
Keith Adams (American football) (born 1979), American football player
Keith John Adams, British singer/songwriter
Keith Adams (weightlifter) (born 1950), Canadian weightlifter
Keith Adams (cricketer) (born 1934), former English cricketer

See also
Adams (surname)